Pat Hughes may refer to:

Pat Hughes (American football) (born 1947), American NFL player
Pat Hughes (aviator) (1917–1940), Australian air ace
Pat Hughes (footballer, born 1939) (1939–2017), Australian international footballer
Pat Hughes (footballer, born 1945) (1945–2010), Scottish footballer
Pat Hughes (Gaelic footballer) (born 1991), Irish Gaelic football player
Pat Hughes (ice hockey) (born 1955), Canadian ice hockey player
Pat Hughes (sportscaster) (born 1955), American baseball broadcaster
Pat Hughes (tennis) (1902–1997), British tennis player

See also
Patrick Hughes (disambiguation)
Hughes (surname)